Michael Reese Douglass (born March 15, 1955) is a former American football player. He played outside linebacker for the Green Bay Packers (1978–1985) and the San Diego Chargers (1986) in the National Football League (NFL). He ranks third in the lists of tackles made by a Packers player.

References

External links
NFL.com player page

1955 births
Living people
Players of American football from St. Louis
American football linebackers
San Diego State Aztecs football players
Green Bay Packers players
San Diego Chargers players
Los Angeles City Cubs football players